The 1966 Paris–Roubaix was the 64th edition of the Paris–Roubaix cycle race and was held on 17 April 1966. The race started in Compiègne and finished in Roubaix. The race was won by Felice Gimondi of the Salvarani team.

General classification

References

Paris–Roubaix
Paris-Roubaix
Paris-Roubaix
Paris-Roubaix
Paris-Roubaix